The  Asian Badminton Championships 1976   took place from 30 October- 7 November in Hyderabad India. Indonesia won the men's team competition after beating China 3–2 in the final. The match for third place between Japan and Malaysia also ended 3–2.

Medalists

Medal table

Final results

Men's team results

Semifinals

China V/s Japan 

Japan conceded last match to China.

Malaysia V/s Indonesia 

Indonesia conceded remaining matches to Malaysia.

Bronze medal tie 
 3 : 2

Final 
China V/s Indonesia

References 

Badminton Asia Championships
1976 in badminton
1976 in India